Ty Panitz (born April 8, 1999) is an American actor. He made his screen debut as a child actor in the movie Yours, Mine & Ours (2005) alongside Dennis Quaid and Rene Russo playing Ethan Beardsley. His other roles include Woody Forrester in How to Eat Fried Worms (2006). Panitz has appeared in the television series Bones, as Special Agent Seeley Booth’s son, Parker. He also appeared in the 2009 films Stolen Lives and Santa Buddies.

Filmography

Video games

References

External links
 
 Ty Panitz official website

1999 births
Male actors from California
American male child actors
American male film actors
American male television actors
American male voice actors
American male video game actors
Living people
21st-century American male actors